The International WorkStar is a line of severe duty trucks produced by Navistar, Inc.  The WorkStar is the successor to the 7400 and 7600 series trucks produced by International.  Starting in 2008 the "thousand series" name was dropped in favor of the WorkStar.  This change was reflected in the physical construction of the truck in the form of a new hood and grill along with increased MaxxForce Engine options.

Models
The WorkStar is commonly custom-built, and has many different layouts. All models are available as 4x2, the 7300-7500 have all-wheel drive 4x4 models. The 7400-7600 are available with both 6x4 and 6x6 tandems, and the 7600 can have an unusual 8x6 layout, with a three driven axle "tridem". Most models can have either forward or set-back front axles.

Electrical systems have become very complex, both for engine control and monitoring the chassis. Controls for power take-offs (PTOs), body operations, snowplow and other types of auxiliary lighting can be factory installed.

Cabs are available in standard, extended, and crew types on all models. Made of galvanized steel, they can have heated windshield, mirrors, air-conditioning and many interior options.

Selected 2016 Models (not all are shown.)

Powertrain 
In 2014, the WorkStar is available with 4 diesel engines.

Eaton/Fuller offers manual transmissions from 6 to 18 speeds, and a self-shifting  manual. Allison offers three automatic transmissions.

2016 Engines

WorkStar applications 
With all the upgrades possible, it can be used as a concrete mixer, where the heavy duty front drive axle is often used. It can also be a semi-tractor, pulling dump or lowboy trailers.

Fire equipment.  In rural areas of the US, especially in state and national parks, fire equipment has to go to remote off-road areas, often carrying water with them. The WorkStar has options needed, high strength and power, heavy duty front drive axle, an advanced electrical system, and a crew-cab. An extreme truck can be ordered with factory parts.

Railroad maintenance. Railroad equipment is very heavy, and the track needs maintenance its whole length, no matter how remote. The WorkStar's chassis can be ordered to mount road-rail pilot wheels, which let the truck run directly on the tracks. Racks can be mounted outside and above the cab so the truck can self-load and unload sections of rail onto them. The crew-cab is often used, and the truck also carries a large amount of tools and equipment.

Street and road maintenance In the northern US snow is a problem for roads, which need to be plowed and salted. Built with wiring and controls for lights and equipment,  body options like heated windshields, mirrors, and seats, the truck comes ready for the service from the factory. The strong chassis with heavy-duty front wheel drive can plow around the clock for days.

Utilities The WorkStar is popular with utilities, who often work off-road for long periods in bad weather. The front driven axle is very useful when the truck is moved to many different sites. The strong frame adapts to outriggers and a long boom, so employees can work on overhead wires.

Aftermarket 
The consumer version of the WorkStar is manufactured by Midwest Automotive Designs, which is a manufacturer based in Elkhart in Indiana that produces conversions of class 5 and 6 commercial trucks conversions as luxury consumer vehicles. The company makes several pickup truck models of the WorkStar, including the International WorkStar Pickup, and WorkStar SUV.

Notes

References

Navistar International trucks
Class 7 trucks
Class 8 trucks
Class 9 trucks
Tractor units